The 2017 USAFL National Championships were the 21st installment of the premier United States annual Australian rules football club tournament. The tournament as held at the Surf Cup Sports Park in San Diego, California on October 20–22.

2017 USAFL National Championships club rankings

Men

Women

References

External links 

USAFL season
Australian rules football competitions
National championships in the United States